This is a list of hardware devices that are shipped with Microsoft's Windows Phone 8 operating system. HTC Corporation, Samsung, Nokia and Huawei have all launched Windows Phone 8 based devices. The list, sorted by processor and screen resolution, contains devices that have been confirmed and officially announced by their manufacturers.

Devices

Dual-core 480p
These devices feature a 480p (WVGA) screen with a 480x800 resolution and a microSD card reader.

Dual-core 720p and WXGA
Non-Nokia devices and the Nokia Lumia 1320 feature a 720p screen and, except for the Samsung devices, lack a microSD card reader. All other Nokia devices feature a WXGA screen at 768x1280.

Quad-core 1080p
Among these devices, only the Nokia Lumia Icon lacks a microSD card reader.

See also 
 Windows Phone version history
 Windows Phone 8
 List of Windows Phone 8.1 devices

References

 
Technology-related lists
Lists of mobile phones